Louis-Auguste Deschamps (1765 in Saint-Omer – 1842 in Paris) was a French botanist and surgeon, who specialised in the flora of Java and Mexico.

References 

1765 births
1842 deaths
18th-century French botanists
19th-century French botanists